Louis René Étienne Tulasne, a.k.a. Edmond Tulasne (12 September 1815 – 22 December 1885) was a French botanist and mycologist born in Azay-le-Rideau.

He originally studied law at Poitiers, but his interest later turned to botany.  As a young man he assisted botanist Auguste de Saint-Hilaire (1779–1853) with studies of Brazilian flora. From 1842 until 1872 he worked as a naturalist at the Muséum national d'histoire naturelle in Paris. In 1854 he succeeded Adrien-Henri de Jussieu (1797–1853) as a member of the Académie des sciences. He died in Hyères on 22 December 1885, age 70.

Tulasne's specialized study was the science of mycology. His microscopic investigation of fungi, particularly parasitic species, contributed much to the understanding on the complexities of their nature and development. He is credited with introducing the concept of "pleomorphy" in regard to fungi. Pleomorphy states that an individual fungus, growing in different substrates can have dramatically different forms. In 1853 he introduced his views on the reproduction cycle of Claviceps purpurea (ergot). Around this time he also developed an interest in lichens, and in 1852 Tulasne published an anatomical and morphological study of this group. It was in this work he introduced the term  to describe the asexual fruiting body found in many species of fungi.

A number of mycological species, as well as the genera Tulasneinia and Tulasnella (family Tulasnellaceae) are named after him. He is credited with providing classification taxa for the following genera: Crucibulum, Glomus, Sebacina, Terfezia, Tilletia and Hypomyces (the latter genus with Elias Magnus Fries).

He also produced some important works on flowering plants. For example, in 1855, he published two papers on the magnoliid family Monimiaceae, in which he included what are now the Lauralean families Siparunaceae and Atherospermataceae.<ref name="tulasne1855annales">Louis-René Tulasne. 1855. "Diagnoses nonnullas e Monimiacearum recensione tentata excerptas præmittit". Annales des Sciences Naturelles; Botanique, series 4, 3:29–144. (See External links below).</ref>

Tulasne published over 50 scientific articles during his career. Some of his best work was done in collaboration with his brother, Charles Tulasne (1816–1884), such as "Fungi hypogaei" (1851) and the three-volume "Selecta fungorum carpologia''" (1861–65). The latter work is known for its superb detailed illustrations, being created by Charles Tulasne.

Many of his works were published under the Latinized name "Ludovicus-Renatus".

References

External links 
 Newsletter of the friends of the Farlow, Number 47  Newsletters  Friends of the Farlow  The Farlow Herbarium (FH)  Herbaria  Collections  Harvard University Herbaria
 page 383, Table des articles  View Book (external)  Annales des sciences naturelles ... Quatrième série. Botanique. Tome III  Titles  Biodiversity Heritage Library
 page 273  View Book  Archives du Muséum d'Histoire Naturelle, Paris. Tome 8  Titles  Biodiversity Heritage Library
 IPNI List of plants described and co-described by Tulasne.

1815 births
1885 deaths
19th-century French botanists
French mycologists
French Roman Catholics
Members of the French Academy of Sciences
People from Indre-et-Loire